Emmanuel Nwanolue Emenanjo, also known as ‘Nolue Emenanjo (born 21 April 1943) is a Nigerian scholar and writer.

Born in Katsina State to Igbo parents, he is the executive director of the National Institute of Nigerian Languages, Aba and a Professor of Linguistics.  Over the years, he has had a multifarious career in publishing, teaching, writing and criticism particularly dealing with the promotion of the Igbo language.

Works
Igbo language and culture, 1973
Elements of modern Igbo grammar: a descriptive approach, 1978
Auxiliaries in Igbo syntax: a comparative study, 1985
Multilingualism, minority languages, and language policy in Nigeria, 1990

References

External links

Igbo writers
Igbo educators
Linguists from Nigeria
Living people
1943 births
Igbo linguists